Dr. Hetherwick Ntaba is a Malawian medical doctor and politician, and former Publicity Secretary of the Democratic Progressive Party (DPP). Ntaba was Minister of Foreign Affairs from 1993 to 1994. Later, he was Secretary-General of the DPP.

References

Year of birth missing (living people)
Living people
Malawian diplomats
Democratic Progressive Party (Malawi) politicians
Foreign Ministers of Malawi
Malawian medical doctors